Stephen Ram may refer to:
 Stephen Ram (died 1746), MP for Gorey and Duleek (Parliament of Ireland constituency)
 Stephen Ram (1744–1821), MP for Duleek and Gorey (Parliament of Ireland constituency)